Nine Mile Ride is a length of the B3430 road in the English county of Berkshire, running from the south of Bracknell to Finchampstead, in the Borough of Wokingham.

Character
The road connects several residential areas in east Berkshire, providing a scenic route between the M3 and M4 motorways. Today, Nine Mile Ride is largely suburban in character, and includes a small selection of shops, pubs and restaurants. In recent years, a number of the older properties along the road have been either renovated and extended, or replaced. A large Romany Gypsy community exists along the Crowthorne section of the road.
The former 'Who'd a Thought It ?' public house along the road, which was demolished in 2003, featured in the 1954 film, Bang! You're Dead.

History 

Despite its straightness, the Nine Mile Ride is not a Roman road but was built for King George III as part of an expansion programme to the rides built for Queen Anne to more easily facilitate hunting in Windsor Forest. It begins at the site of Swinley Lodge, the home of the Royal Buckhounds. The road lies almost parallel to the Devil's Highway (Roman Britain), a Roman road running from London to Silchester. However, that road runs at a greater height and there is little in the way of settlements along its high path. There is a large Iron Age hillfort at its eastern end known as Caesar's Camp, Bracknell Forest. 

Buildings and structures in Berkshire
Historic trails and roads in the United Kingdom